Bob Ray is an independent American filmmaker based in Austin, Texas.

In 1994 Ray founded the production company CrashCam Films.  CrashCam Films' first productions were narrative Super 8 mm films and music videos.  Bob Ray's in-camera-edited Super 8 short “Sweet Sweetroll’s BaadAsssss Spin” found its way onto indie producer John Pierson’s show Split/Screen on the Independent Film Channel and Bravo (television network).

Ray made his feature film debut with the rock ‘n’ roll stoner cult film Rock Opera.  Ray wrote and directed Rock Opera with very limited resources.  The film has accumulated several rave reviews and a 2003 High Times Magazine nomination for a Stony Film Award.

Ray has produced and directed several music videos, including a video for the Grammy nominated song “Fried Chicken and Coffee” by Nashville Pussy, and videos for songs by The Riverboat Gamblers, U.S.S. Friendship, Dambaby (featuring Sam McCandless of Cold), The Phantom Creeps and more.

Continuing his close affiliation with the music community, Ray has worked with The Polyphonic Spree, The Black Eyed Peas, Eels, Jerry Cantrell, Blur, Supergrass, The Rapture, Junior Brown, Jurassic Five, Puffy, Modest Mouse, Pete Yorn, Clinic, Starsailor, Don Walser, The Shins, Ozo Matli, Stephen Malkmus, Hank Williams III, X-Ecutioners, …And You Will Know Us by the Trail of Dead and many others.

In 2007, Ray completed work on a critically acclaimed feature-length documentary film about the resurgence of all-girl roller derby.  Hell on Wheels tells the story of a group of Texas women who band together to resurrect the sport of roller derby. That year, Ray launched CrashToons, the animation arm of CrashCam Films, and has been consistently creating short animated films. CrashToons titles include "APESH!T," "Platypus Rex," "CrashToons Presents," Rooster Lollipop," and "Limp Dictionary."  Ray's animated shorts have been seen at a bevy of film festivals, on SuperDeluxe.com and currently, Playboy.com is airing two animated series created by Ray.

Bob Ray premiered his new film, Total Badass, a documentary about Austin raconteur Chad Holt on May 19, 2010. Forgoing the usual route of signing a deal with a movie distributor, the movie will instead be showcased at different venues around the United States, along with some of the filmmaker's other independent films, such as the 2007's documentary Hell on Wheels and Ray's animated shorts, CrashToons.

Filmography 
The Down Side (in development)
Total Badass (documentary; 2010)
Platypus Rex (animated series; ongoing)
CrashToons Presents" (animated series; ongoing)
APESH!T a.k.a. Ape Shit (animated series, ongoing)
Hell on Wheels (2007)
Hillbilly Doomsday (short) (2004)
Wrecked (short) (2002)
Rock Opera (2001)
Night of the Kung Fu Bastards from Hell! (short) (1997)
Six Pack of Wup Ass (short) (1997)
Sweet Sweetroll's BaadAsssss Spin (short) (1997)
Cocaine Ninja (short) (1996)
The Adventures of Donald Starkland (short) (1994)

References

External links 
 
CrashCam Films home page - filmmaker Bob Ray's Austin, Texas based production company
CrashToons home page
"Rock Opera" home page
"Hell On Wheels" home page
"APESH!T" home page
Austin Chronicle; From Slacker to Rock Opera: Richard Linklater Interviews Bob Ray
^ Hale, Mike (November 18, 2010). "Sport and Grim Reality". New York Times. New York Times Co.. http://movies.nytimes.com/2010/11/19/movies/19haleroundup.html. Retrieved November 18, 2010.

Year of birth missing (living people)
Living people
American filmmakers
Artists from Austin, Texas
Place of birth missing (living people)